Tebrau is a federal constituency in Johor Bahru District and Kulai District, Johor, Malaysia, that has been represented in the Dewan Rakyat since 1986.

The federal constituency was created in the 1984 redistribution and is mandated to return a single member to the Dewan Rakyat under the first past the post voting system.

Demographics

History

Polling districts 
According to the gazette issued on 31 October 2022, the Tebrau constituency has a total of 44 polling districts.

Representation history

State constituency

Current state assembly members

Local governments

Election results

References

Johor federal constituencies